The Totarakaitorea River is a short river of the West Coast Region of New Zealand's South Island. It flows west to reach the Three Mile Lagoon  to the south of Okarito.

See also
List of rivers of New Zealand

References

Rivers of the West Coast, New Zealand
Westland District
Rivers of New Zealand